In probability theory, although simple examples illustrate that linear uncorrelatedness of two random variables does not in general imply their independence, it is sometimes mistakenly thought that it does imply that when the two random variables are normally distributed. This article demonstrates that assumption of normal distributions does not have that consequence, although the multivariate normal distribution, including the bivariate normal distribution, does.

Examples

A symmetric example 

Suppose  has a normal distribution with expected value 0 and variance 1. Let . Then 

 both have the same normal distribution; and

 

 

 

(since  and  both have the same normal distribution), where  is the cumulative distribution function of the Standard normal distribution..

Finally, the distribution of the simple linear combination  concentrates positive probability at 0: .

An asymmetric example 

Suppose  has a normal distribution with expected value 0 and variance 1.  Let

 

where  is a positive number to be specified below. If  is very small, then the correlation  is near  if  is very large, then  is near 1. That value is approximately 1.54.

To see that  is normally distributed—indeed, that its distribution is the same as that of  —one may compute its cumulative distribution function:

In this example, the difference  is nowhere near being normally distributed, since it has a substantial probability (about 0.88) of it being equal to 0. By contrast, the normal distribution, being a continuous distribution, has no discrete part—that is, it does not concentrate more than zero probability at any single point.

Examples with support almost everywhere in ℝ2 

It is well-known that the ratio  of two independent standard normal random deviates  and  has a Cauchy distribution. Cranking through the math one finds that

 

The figure shows scatterplots of samples drawn from the above distribution. This furnishes two examples of bivariate distributions that are uncorrelated and have normal marginal distributions but are not independent.

See also 

 Correlation and dependence

References 

Notes

Theory of probability distributions
Covariance and correlation
Normal distribution